Paradis is a neighbourhood in the city of Kristiansand in Agder county, Norway. It is located in the borough of Grim and in the district of Grim. Paradis is northwest of Grimsmyra, north of Klappane, west of Enrum.

Transport

References

Geography of Kristiansand
Neighbourhoods of Kristiansand